Myra Taylor may refer to:

 Myra Taylor (singer) (1917–2011), American jazz singer
 Myra Taylor (scriptwriter) (1934–2012), British sitcom writer
 Myra Louise Taylor (1881–1939), Canadian nurse
 Myra Juliet Farrell (1878–1957), Australian inventor